Matthew Marsh (born 8 July 1954) is an English actor. He is the older brother of Jon Marsh of the English dance band "The Beloved". He has appeared in the films The Fourth Protocol (1987), Diamond Skulls (1989), Mountains of the Moon (1990), Alambrado (1991), Dirty Weekend (1993), Spy Game (2001), Miranda (2002), Bad Company (2002), Quicksand (2003) and An American Haunting (2005). In 2011 Marsh starred in the biopic film The Iron Lady as the United States Secretary of State Alexander Haig. In 2005, Marsh starred as Simon Hewitt in the first series of The Thick of It.

In May 1998, Marsh portrayed the character Alex Duncan in the British TV program As Time Goes By, series 7, episode 3 entitled "The New Neighbours". He co-starred with Amanda Burton in The Commander, and guest-starred in the sixth series of the spy drama Spooks in 2007 and the second series of Lewis in 2008. He played Harry Gallo in the New Tricks (series 7, episode 9) "Gloves Off" in 2010. He appeared twice in Midsomer Murders (season 6, episode 3 "Painted Blood" and season 10, episode 7 "They Seek Him Here"). He has also appeared in the Red Dwarf episode "Holoship" and the fifth episode of series two of Game On, "Tangerine Candy Floss and Herne Bay Rock" as Brian Kennedy, Mandy's lecherous former university tutor in 1996, as well as portraying Elton John in John and Yoko: A Love Story the 1985 made-for-TV film. In 2019 Marsh went on to play Jacques De Molay, the ill-fated 14th century Grand Master of the Knights Templar in seven episodes of History's Knightfall.

His frequent theatre work includes Copenhagen (1998) and Blood and Gifts (2010). He played Winston Churchill in Michael Dobbs's play Turning Point which aired as one of a series of TV plays broadcast live on Sky Arts channel. The two-hander depicted a little-known October 1938 meeting between the future prime minister and Soviet spy Guy Burgess, then a young man working for the BBC. Burgess was played by Benedict Cumberbatch, with whom Marsh had previously worked in the acclaimed 2004 TV movie Hawking.

Filmography

Film

Television

Video games

References

External links

1954 births
English male film actors
English male television actors
Living people